Bahrain is divided into four Governorates: the Capital, Northern, Southern and Muharraq. Until September 2014, there were five, when the Central Governorate was abolished.

Each governorate is governed by a Governor, appointed by the Prime Minister, and has its own municipality council, with separate elections for them. The first municipal elections in Bahrain held after independence in 1971, was held in conjunction with the 2002 Bahraini general election. The most recent was held in conjunction with the 2018 Bahraini general election.

History
The first municipality in Bahrain was the 8-member Manama municipality which was established in July 1919.  Members of the municipality were elected annually; the municipality was said to have been the first municipality to be established in the Arab world. The municipality was in charge of cleaning roads and renting buildings to tenants and shops. The first municipal elections, to fill half the seats on local councils, were held in 1926. By 1929, it undertook road expansions as well as opening markets and slaughterhouses. 

In 1958, the municipality started water purification projects. In 1960, Bahrain comprised four municipalities: Manama, Hidd, Al Muharraq, and Riffa.  Over the next 30 years, the four municipalities were divided into 12 municipalities as settlements such as Hamad Town and Isa Town grew. These municipalities were administered from Manama under a central municipal council whose members are appointed by the king.

Since 22 September 2014, Bahrain has been divided into four governorates:

Constituencies
Each governorate is divided into a specific number of constituencies for the election of the country's Council of Representatives. Each constituency is listed as area 1, area 2 etc. Elections are held in these constituencies every four years, with each constituency electing one member. The most recent election was the 2018 Bahraini general election. Only Bahraini citizens are entitled to stand for and to vote at elections.

See also 
 Geography of Bahrain
 ISO 3166-2:BH

References

External links 
 
 Divisions of Bahrain

 
Subdivisions of Bahrain
Bahrain, Governorates
Bahrain 1
Governorates, Bahrain
Bahrain geography-related lists
Bahrain